Kai-Fu Lee (born December 3, 1961) is a Taiwanese computer scientist, businessman, and writer. He is currently based in Beijing, China.

Lee developed a speaker-independent, continuous speech recognition system as his Ph.D. thesis at Carnegie Mellon University. He later worked as an executive, first at Apple, then SGI, Microsoft, and Google.

He became the focus of a 2005 legal dispute between Google and Microsoft, his former employer, due to a one-year non-compete agreement that he signed with Microsoft in 2000 when he became its corporate vice president of interactive services.

One of the most prominent figures in the Chinese internet sector, he was the founding director of Microsoft Research Asia, serving from 1998 to 2000; and president of Google China, serving from July 2005 through September 4, 2009. After resigning from his post, he founded Sinovation Ventures, a venture capital firm. He created a website,  dedicated to helping young Chinese people achieve in their studies and careers, and his "10 Letters to Chinese College Students" have spread widely on the web. He is one of the most followed micro-bloggers in China, in particular on Sina Weibo, where he has over 50 million followers.

In his 2018 book AI Superpowers: China, Silicon Valley, and the New World Order, Lee describes how China is rapidly moving forward to become the global leader in AI, and may well surpass the United States, because of China's demographics and its amassing of huge data sets. In a 28 September 2018 interview on the PBS Amanpour program, he stated that artificial intelligence, with all its capabilities, will never be capable of creativity or empathy.

Early life and education 
Lee was born in Taipei, Taiwan. He is the son of Li Tianmin, a legislator and historian from Sichuan, China. Lee has detailed his personal life and career history in his autobiography in both Chinese and English, Making a World of Difference, published in October 2011.

In 1973, Lee immigrated to the United States and attended high school in Oak Ridge, Tennessee. He received a bachelor of science summa cum laude with a major in computer science from Columbia University in the City of New York in 1983. He was a classmate of Barack Obama at Columbia. He went on and received a doctor of philosophy in computer science from Carnegie Mellon University in 1988.

Career

Academic research 
At Carnegie Mellon, Lee worked on topics in machine learning and pattern recognition. In 1986, he and Sanjoy Mahajan developed Bill, a Bayesian learning-based system for playing the board game Othello that won the US national tournament of computer players in 1989. In 1988, he completed his doctoral dissertation on Sphinx, which he claims is the first large-vocabulary, speaker-independent, continuous speech recognition system.

Lee has written two books on speech recognition and more than 60 papers in computer science. His doctoral dissertation was published in 1988 as a Kluwer monograph, Automatic Speech Recognition: The Development of the Sphinx Recognition System. Together with Alex Waibel, another Carnegie Mellon researcher, Lee edited Readings in Speech Recognition (1990).

Apple, Silicon Graphics, and Microsoft 
After two years as a faculty member at Carnegie Mellon, Lee joined Apple Computer in 1990 as a principal research scientist. While at Apple (1990–1996), he headed R&D groups responsible for Apple Bandai Pippin, PlainTalk, Casper (speech interface), GalaTea (text to speech system) for Mac Computers.

Lee moved to Silicon Graphics in 1996 and spent a year as the Vice President of its Web Products division, and another year as president of its multimedia software division, Cosmo Software.

In 1998, Lee moved to Microsoft and went to Beijing, China where he played a key role in establishing the Microsoft Research (MSR) division there. MSR China later became known as Microsoft Research Asia, regarded as one of the best computer science research labs in the world. Lee returned to the United States in 2000 and was promoted to corporate vice president of interactive services division at Microsoft from 2000 to 2005.

Move from Microsoft to Google 
In July 2005, Lee left Microsoft to take a position at Google. The search company agreed to compensation worth in excess of $10 million, including a $2.5 million cash 'signing bonus' and another $1.5 million cash payment after one year, a package referred to internally at Google as 'unprecedented'.

On July 19, 2005, Microsoft sued Google and Lee in a Washington state court over Google's hiring of its former Vice President of Interactive Services, claiming that Lee was violating his non-compete agreement by working for Google within one year of leaving the Redmond-based software corporation. Microsoft argued that Lee would inevitably disclose proprietary information to Google if he was allowed to work there.

On July 28, 2005, Washington state Superior Court Judge Steven González granted Microsoft a temporary restraining order, which prohibited Lee from working on Google projects that compete with Microsoft pending a trial scheduled for January 9, 2006. On September 13, following a hearing, Judge González issued a ruling permitting Lee to work for Google, but barring him from starting work on some technical projects until the case went to trial in January 2006. Lee was still allowed to recruit employees for Google in China and to talk to government officials about licensing, but was prohibited from working on technologies such as search or speech recognition. Lee was also prohibited from setting budgets, salaries, and research directions for Google in China until the case was to go to trial in January 2006.

Before the case could go to trial, on December 22, 2005, Google and Microsoft announced that they had reached a settlement whose terms are confidential, ending a five-month dispute between the two companies.

At Google China, Lee helped establish the company in the market and oversaw its growth in the country. Under his tenure, the Google.cn regional website was launched. He also strengthened the company's teams of engineers and scientists in the country.

On September 4, 2009, Lee announced his resignation from Google. He said "With a very strong leadership team in place, it seemed a very good moment for me to move to the next chapter in my career." Alan Eustace, senior Google vice-president for engineering, credited him with "helping dramatically to improve the quality and range of services that we offer in China, and ensuring that we continue to innovate on the Web for the benefit of users and advertisers". Several months after Lee's departure, Google announced that it would stop censorship and move its mainland China servers to Hong Kong.

Sinovation Ventures 

On September 7, 2009 he announced details of a $115m venture capital (early-stage incubation and seed money business model) fund called "Innovation Works" (later changed to "Sinovation Ventures") that aims to create five successful Chinese start-ups a year in internet and mobile internet businesses or in vast hosting services known as cloud computing. The Innovation Works fund has attracted several investors, including Steve Chen, co-founder of YouTube; Foxconn, the electronics contract manufacturer; Legend Holdings, the parent of PC maker Lenovo; and WI Harper Group.

In September 2010, Lee described two Google Android projects for Chinese users: Tapas, a smartphone operating system tailored for Chinese users; and Wandoujia (SnapPea), a desktop phone manager for Android.

In December 2012, Innovation Works announced that it had closed a second US$275 million fund.

In September 2016, the company announced its corporate name change from Innovation Works to "Sinovation Ventures," closing US$674 million (4.5 billion Chinese yuan) capital injection. Total fund size of Sinovation Ventures exceed US$1 billion. In April 2018, Sinovation Ventures announced its US dollar Fund IV of $500 million. To date, Sinovation Ventures' total asset under management with its dual currency reaches US$2 billion and has invested over 300 portfolios primarily in China.

Previous positions 
 Vice President, Google; President, Google Greater China, July 2005–September 4, 2009
 Corporate Vice President, Natural Interactive Services Division (NISD), Microsoft Corp. 2000–July 2005
 Founder & Managing Director, Microsoft Research Asia, China, 1998–2000
 President, Cosmo Software, Multimedia software business unit of Silicon Graphics Inc. (SGI), 1999–2000
 Vice President & General Manager, Web Products, Silicon Graphics Inc. (SGI), 1998–1999
 Vice President, Interactive Media Group, Apple Computer, 1997–1998
 Director, Interactive Media, Advanced Technology Group, Apple Computer, 1994–1997
 Manager, Speech & Language Technologies Group, Apple Computer, 1991–1994
 Principal Speech Scientist, Apple Computer, 1990–1991
 Assistant Professor, Carnegie Mellon University, July 1990
 Research Computer Scientist, Carnegie Mellon University, 1988–1990

Education 
 Ph.D. in Computer Science, Carnegie Mellon University, 1988
 B.S. in Computer Science, Columbia University, 1983

Recognition 
 Chairman World Economic Forum's Global AI Council
 Asia House Asian Business Leader 2018
 Fellow, IEEE (inducted 2002)
 Member, Committee of 100
 Time 100, 2013
 Honorary Doctorate Degree, Carnegie Mellon University
 Honorary Doctorate Degree, City University of Hong Kong

Publications 
 
 Be Your Personal Best (《做最好的自己》, published September 2005, People's Publishing House)
 Making A World of Difference - Kai-Fu Lee Biography (《世界因你而不同》, published September 2009, China CITIC Press)
 Seeing Life Through Death (《向死而生》, published July 2015, by China CITIC Press)
 A Walk Into The Future (《与未来同行》, published October 2006, People's Publishing House)
 To Student With Love (《一往情深》, published October 2007, People's Publishing House)
 Weibo Changing Everything (《微博改变一切》, published February 2011, Beijing Xiron Books Co., Ltd)
 Artificial Intelligence (《人工智能》, published May 2017, Beijing Xiron Books Co., Ltd)
 AI 2041: Ten Visions for Our Future (with Chen Qiufan.《AI 2041：預見10個未來新世界》, published June 2021, Taiwan Commonwealth Publishing Co., Ltd)

Controversies 
Lee was barred from Weibo for three days after he used Weibo to complain about China's Internet controls. A February 16, 2013, post summarized a Wall Street Journal article about how slow speeds and instability deter overseas businesses from locating critical functions in China. In January 2013, he also posted support for staff of a Guangzhou-based newspaper during a standoff with government censors. He was also a vocal critic of the government's blocking of GitHub, which he said was detrimental to China's competitiveness.

Personal life 
Lee posted on Weibo on 5 September 2013 that he had been diagnosed with lymphoma. In December 2018, Lee spoke at the End Well Symposium on end of life in San Francisco, stating: “I was a maniacal workaholic. That workaholism ended abruptly about five years ago, when I was diagnosed with Stage IV lymphoma.”

References

External links 

 Profile at Sinovation Ventures
 Making a World of Difference – 2011 autobiography (English)

Interviews 
 BBC Interview of the Week: Kai-Fu Lee (2018)
 "Kai-Fu Lee on the Future of AI", 2019 TED Interview
 "Kai-Fu Lee: AI Superpowers – China and Silicon Valley", 2019 Artificial Intelligence (AI) Podcast 

1961 births
Living people
21st-century American non-fiction writers
American bloggers
American people of Taiwanese descent
American computer businesspeople
American computer scientists
American expatriates in China
American technology chief executives
American technology writers
Businesspeople from Taipei
Businesspeople from Tennessee
Businesspeople in information technology
Carnegie Mellon University alumni
Carnegie Mellon University faculty
Columbia School of Engineering and Applied Science alumni
Fellow Members of the IEEE
Members of Committee of 100
Microsoft employees
Microsoft Research people
People from Oak Ridge, Tennessee
Speech processing researchers
Taiwanese bloggers
Taiwanese computer scientists
Taiwanese emigrants to the United States
Writers from Tennessee
Columbia College (New York) alumni